The Vilhelm Bjerknes Medal is an award presented by the European Geosciences Union (and its predecessor, the European Geophysical Society) that recognizes "distinguished research in atmospheric sciences". It was first awarded in 1997, to Brian Hoskins, and later recipients include the Nobel-Prize-winning oceanographer and climate scientist Klaus Hasselmann. The award is named for Norwegian pioneer of weather forecasting Vilhelm Bjerknes, whose likeness features on the medal itself, designed by sculptor József Kótai.

Recipients 

 2023 – Christoph Schär
 2022 – Hugh Coe
 2021 – Spyros Pandis
 2020 – Michael Prather
 2019 – Johannes Lelieveld
 2018 – Pinhas Alpert
 2017 – John Plane
 2016 – Maria Kanakidou
 2014 – Urs Baltensperger
 2013 – John Burrows
 2012 – Adrian Simmons
 2011 – Karin Labitzke
 2010 – Akio Arakawa
 2009 – J. Ray Bates
 2008 – Gury Marchuk
 2007 – Markku Kulmala
 2006 – Erich Roeckner
 2005 – David Williamson
 2004 – Joseph Egger
 2003 – Joost  Businger
 2002 – Klaus Hasselmann
 2001 – Fedor Mesinger
 2000 – Sergej Zilitinkevich
 1999 – Jean-Claude André
 1998 – Arnt Eliassen
 1997 – Brian Hoskins

See also
 List of meteorology awards
 List of prizes named after people

References

External links 
 Official website

Meteorology awards
Awards established in 1997
Awards of the European Geosciences Union